The New Zealand Anaesthetic Technicians' Society - A body representing Anaesthetic Technicians' in New Zealand.

Anaesthetic Technicians are healthcare workers employed in the New Zealand health service. Anaesthetic Technicians work as a member of a multi-disciplinary team that includes doctors, nurses and support workers. NZATS is the professional body representing Registered and Trainee Anaesthetic Technicians within New Zealand. NZATS provides continuing professional development opportunities, trainee education and support to all its members by promoting the profession. The New Zealand Anaesthetic Technicians Society hold a voluntary register of members.  Anaesthetic Technicians have been registered under the Health Practitioners Competence Assurance Act 2003 since 2013 with the Medical Sciences Council of New Zealand.

Anaesthetic Technicians are involved with all aspects of the delivery of a patient's perioperative anaesthetic care.

Medical and health organisations based in New Zealand